Sorge is a village and a former municipality in the district of Harz, in Saxony-Anhalt, Germany. Since 1 January 2010, it is part of the town Oberharz am Brocken. The name of the town means "Worry" in German.

Former municipalities in Saxony-Anhalt
Oberharz am Brocken
Villages in the Harz